The name Rosamund (also spelled Rosamond and Rosamunde) is a feminine given name and can also be a family name (surname).  Originally it combined the Germanic  elements hros, meaning horse, and mund, meaning "protection".  Later, it was influenced by the Latin phrases rosa munda, meaning "pure rose", and rosa mundi, meaning "rose of the world". "Rosamunda" is the Italian, "Rosamunde" is the German and "Rosemonde" the French form of the name. 

People named Rosamund include:

 Rosamund (wife of Alboin) (fl. sixth century), second wife of Alboin, King of the Germanic Lombards
 Rosamund Bartlett, American writer, scholar, translator and lecturer specializing in Russian literature
 Rosamund Clifford (before 1150–c. 1176), medieval beauty and longtime mistress of King Henry II
 Rosamund Greenwood (1907–1997), British actress
 Rosamund John (1913–1998), English actress
 Rosamund Kwan (born 1962), Chinese actress
 Rosamund Lupton (born 1964), British author
 Rosamunde Pilcher (1924–2019), British author
 Rosamund Pike (born 1979), English actress
 Rosamund Hanson (born 1989), English actress
 Rosamund Stanhope (1919–2005), British poet and teacher
Rosamund Vallings, New Zealand doctor, specialist in chronic fatigue syndrome 
 Rosamund Marriott Watson (1860–1911), English poet and critic who wrote under the pseudonym of Graham R. Tomson

References

English feminine given names
Given names derived from plants or flowers